Guy Joseph Bonnet (June 10, 1773 – January 9, 1843) was a Haitian historian and a major general of the Army of the Republic of Haiti. He was one of the signers of the Haitian Act of Independence, which formally declared Haiti independent from French colonial rule. He is known for his historical book Souvenirs Historiques (Historical Memories), published posthumously in 1864.

He was Minister of Finance from 1808 to 1810.

References

 
 

1773 births
1843 deaths
19th-century Haitian historians
Haitian male writers
Haitian military personnel
Presidents of the Senate (Haiti)
Finance ministers of Haiti